Georgiana Caroline Clavering-Cowper, Countess Cowper (born Georgiana Caroline Carteret; 12 March 1715 – 21 August 1780), was an English noblewoman.

Countess Cowper was the third daughter of John Carteret, 2nd Earl Granville, by his first wife, the former Frances Worsley. Her first husband, whom she married on 14 February 1732, was John Spencer MP. They had two children:
 John Spencer, 1st Earl Spencer (19 December 1734 – 31 October 1783); married Margaret Georgiana Poyntz in 1755, and had issue, including Georgiana Cavendish, Duchess of Devonshire.
 Diana Spencer (c.1735 – c.1743)

Spencer died in 1746; according to Horace Walpole, his death was alcohol-related. On 1 May 1750, his widow married William Clavering-Cowper, 2nd Earl Cowper, whose first wife, Henrietta Nassau d'Auverquerque, had died in 1747, leaving him with two children. There were no children from this second marriage, and William died in 1764, succeeded in the earldom by Georgiana's stepson, George.

She was an admirer of the novelist Laurence Sterne, and a patron of the Irish writer John Pilkington, whose semi-autobiographical work, The Real Story of John Carteret Pilkington, was published in 1760. Pilkington had been given his middle name in honour of the countess's father and named his daughter after the countess in recognition of her service to him. Her portrait was painted by Godfrey Kneller. The painting was copied by Mrs Delany, whose sister Anne was also a correspondent of the countess.

She died in 1780, aged 65.

References

1715 births
1780 deaths
18th-century English nobility
British countesses
Daughters of British earls
Carteret family
Georgiana
18th-century English women
Patrons of literature